In enzymology, a farnesol dehydrogenase is an enzyme that catalyzes the chemical reaction

2-trans,6-trans-farnesol + NADP+  2-trans,6-trans-farnesal + NADPH + H+

Thus, the two substrates of this enzyme are 2-trans,6-trans-farnesol and NADP+, whereas its 3 products are 2-trans,6-trans-farnesal, NADPH, and H+.

This enzyme belongs to the family of oxidoreductases, specifically those acting on the CH-OH group of donor with NAD+ or NADP+ as acceptor. The systematic name of this enzyme class is 2-trans,6-trans-farnesol:NADP+ 1-oxidoreductase. Other names in common use include NADP+-farnesol dehydrogenase, and farnesol (nicotinamide adenine dinucleotide phosphate) dehydrogenase.

References

 

EC 1.1.1
NADPH-dependent enzymes
Enzymes of unknown structure